Carsten Embach (born 12 October 1968 in Stralsund) is a German bobsledder who competed from the mid-1990s to the early 2000s. Competing in two Winter Olympics, he won two medals in the four-man event with a gold in 2002 and a bronze in 1994.

Biography
Embach also won six medals in the four-man event at the FIBT World Championships with four golds (1995, 1997, 2000, 2003), one silver (2001), and one bronze (1996).

Before turning to bobsleigh Embach competed in the long jump. He finished fifth at the 1990 European Indoor Championships with a jump of 7.83 metres. His personal best jump was 8.01 metres, achieved in June 1990 in Potsdam. He represented the club ASK Vorwärts Potsdam.

References

External links
 
 
 

1968 births
Living people
East German male long jumpers
German male bobsledders
People from Stralsund
Bobsledders at the 1994 Winter Olympics
Bobsledders at the 2002 Winter Olympics
Olympic bobsledders of Germany
Olympic gold medalists for Germany
Olympic bronze medalists for Germany
Olympic medalists in bobsleigh
Medalists at the 2002 Winter Olympics
Medalists at the 1994 Winter Olympics
Sportspeople from Mecklenburg-Western Pomerania